Jama Nigus (in Amharic: ጀማንጉስ ) is a village located in Albukko district, South Wollo, Ethiopia , fifteen miles south  of Kombolcha.

The Mosque in Jama Nigus was first founded by the militant scholar Shaykh Muhammad Shafi b. Asqari Muhammad in the last quarter of eighteenth century as a traditional Islamic education and Sufi-center.

References 

Populated places in the Amhara Region